Namp'o station is a railway station in Hanggu-guyŏk, Namp'o Special City, North Korea on the P'yŏngnam Line of the Korean State Railway, as well as the starting point of the Tojiri Line. There is an engine house northwest of the station in Munhwa-dong, Hanggu-guyŏk.

History
Originally called Chinnamp'o station, it was opened by the Chosen Government Railway, along with the rest of the mainline of the P'yŏngnam Line, on 16 October 1910.

In December 2022, a new station building was completed.

Services
This is a very busy station, serving North Korea's busiest port in terms of international import-export shipping, as well as the Namp'o base of the Korean People's Navy and a coal loading dock.

A number of passenger trains also serve the station. These are:

 Semi-express trains 146-147/148-149 between Sinŭiju Ch'ŏngnyŏn on the P'yŏngŭi Line and Namp'o via P'yŏngyang; 
 Regional trains 226-227/228-229 between Tŏkch'ŏn on the P'yŏngdŏk Line and P'yŏngnam Onch'ŏn via P'yŏngyang and Namp'o; 
 Regional trains 225/230 between Potonggang and P'yŏngnam Onch'ŏn via Namp'o;
 Regional trains 240-241/242-243 between Haeju Ch'ŏngnyŏn on the Hwanghae Ch'ŏngnyŏn Line and Namp'o via P'yŏngyang.
 Local trains 361/362, operating between Namp'o and Ch'ŏlgwang, running from Namp'o to Sillyŏngri on the P'yŏngnam Line and continuing to Ch'ŏlgwang via the Sŏhae Kammun Line.

Due to the poor state of the tracks, at present the travel time for trains between P'yŏngyang and Namp'o is around three hours.

References

Railway stations in North Korea
Railway stations opened in 1910